Goombi is a rural locality in the Western Downs Region, Queensland, Australia.

Goombi is one end of the Queensland rabbit-proof fence.

Goombi's postcode is 4413.

Geography 
Goombi is a sparsely populated rural area, fully developed as farm land.

The Warrego Highway passes east to west through the northern part of the locality. The Western railway line runs parallel and immediately south of the highway, with Goombi railway station serving the locality.

History 
Goombi State School opened on 16 November 1915. It closed in 1964. It was on the southern side of the Warrego Highway opposite the Goombi railway station.

Unity Provisional School opened on 16 November 1922 and closed in 1931. It was on the south-western corner of Lees Road and B Kerrs Road on the present-day boundary between Goombi and Rywung.

References

Western Downs Region
Localities in Queensland